Street Trauma is a mixtape by English hip hop collective D-Block Europe. It was released on 27 December 2019. The album was BPI certified Silver on 19 March 2021.

Release
In early December 2019, rapper Young Adz announced on his official Instagram that the group would release their next mixtape on 27 December 2019.

Singles and charting songs
"No Cellular Site", the mixtape's only single, reached number 29 on the UK Singles Chart. Two other songs, "Creep" and "Molly World", charted the week of the mixtape's chart debut, reaching numbers 53 and 63 on the UK Singles Chart, respectively.

Track listing

Charts

Certifications

References

External links
 
 

2019 mixtape albums
D-Block Europe albums
Self-released albums